The 2014 Big Ten Conference football season was the 119th season of college football play for the Big Ten Conference and was a part of the 2014 NCAA Division I FBS football season. The conference began its season on Thursday, August 28, as Minnesota and Rutgers opened their seasons. The remainder of the teams in the conference began their season on August 30.

This was the Big Ten's first season with 14 teams as Maryland and Rutgers joined the conference. It was also the first season with the two seven-team divisions; when Maryland and Rutgers joined, the conference reorganized its divisions on a pure geographic basis. The six schools in the Central Time Zone were joined by Purdue in the new West Division, with the other schools making up the East Division. Under the new setup, the only protected cross-division rivalry game will be Indiana–Purdue.

Ohio State routed Wisconsin, 59–0, to win 2014 Big Ten Football Championship Game in Indianapolis.  The Buckeyes then advanced to the first ever College Football Playoff where they defeated Alabama in the Sugar Bowl semifinal game and then defeated Oregon in the 2015 College Football Playoff National Championship to claim their eighth national championship in school history.

For the first time in several years, the Big Ten finished the season with two consensus top-five teams. In addition to Ohio State's consensus national title, Michigan State finished the season as the consensus #5 team in the nation.

Rankings

Spring games
(Attendance in parentheses)

April 5
Michigan (15,000)

April 11
Maryland (8,319)

April 12
Illinois (5,105)
Indiana (9,231)
Minnesota (5,000)
Nebraska (61,772)
Northwestern (N/A)
Ohio State (61,058)
Penn State (72,000)
Purdue (7,175)
Wisconsin (8,204)

April 26
Iowa (20,400)
Michigan State (35,000)
Rutgers (11,500)

Homecoming games

Schedule

All times Eastern time.

† denotes Homecoming game

Week 1

Week 2

Week 3

Week 4

Week 5

Week 6

Week 7

Week 8

Week 9

Week 10

Week 11

Week 12

Week 13

Week 14

Big Ten Championship Game

Bowl games
Big Ten bowl games for the 2014 season are:

Rankings are from AP Poll.  All times Eastern Time Zone.

Records against FBS conferences
2014 records against FBS conferences:

Through games of January 12, 2015

Players of the Week

Players of the Year
2014 Big Ten Player of the Year awards

All-Conference Players
Coaches All-Conference Selections

Unanimous selections in ALL CAPS

Honorable Mention: Illinois: V’Angelo Bentley, Mikey Dudek, Teddy Karras, Mason Monheim, Jihad Ward; Indiana: Antonio Allen, Dan Feeney, Collin Rahrig, Bobby Richardson, Shane Wynn; Iowa: Andrew Donnal, Jordan Lomax, John Lowdermilk, Drew Ott, Tevaun Smith; Maryland: Cole Farrand, Andre Monroe; Michigan: Brennan Beyer, Will Hagerup, Raymon Taylor; Michigan State: Ed Davis, Jeremy Langford, Josiah Price, Marcus Rush, Mike Sadler; Minnesota: Cameron Botticelli, Josh Campion, Theiren Cockran, Tommy Olson; Nebraska: Zaire Anderson, Jake Cotton, Sam Foltz, Nate Gerry, Alex Lewis, Josh Mitchell; Northwestern: Chi Chi Ariguzo, Justin Jackson, Dean Lowry, Nick Van Hoose, Brandon Vitabile, Dan Vitale; Ohio State: Darryl Baldwin, Cameron Johnston, Joshua Perry, Devin Smith, Evan Spencer; Penn State: Adrian Amos, Deion Barnes, DaeSean Hamilton, Jesse James, Jordan Lucas; Purdue: Landon Feichter, Paul Griggs; Rutgers: Leonte Carroo, Kaleb Johnson; Wisconsin: Vince Biegel, Rafael Gaglianone, Dallas Lewallen, Tyler Marz, Joe Schobert, Marcus Trotter, Dan Voltz.

Unanimous selections in ALL CAPS

Media All-Conference Selections

Honorable Mention: Illinois: Taylor Barton, V’Angelo Bentley, Ted Karras, Mason Monheim; Indiana: Antonio Allen, Dan Feeney, Collin Rahrig, Bobby Richardson, Jason Spriggs, Shane Wynn; Iowa: Quinton Alston, Austin Blythe, Jake Duzey, John Lowdermilk, Desmond King, Louis Trinca-Pasat; Maryland: Sean Davis, Stefon Diggs, Cole Farrand, Darius Kilgo, Yannick Ngakoue; Michigan: Brennan Beyer, Blake Countess, Devin Funchess, Raymon Taylor; Michigan State: Ed Davis, Taiwan Jones, Jeremy Langford, Josiah Price, Marcus Rush, Mike Sadler; Minnesota: Cameron Botticelli, Josh Campion, Theiren Cockran, Eric Murray, Tommy Olson; Nebraska: Zaire Anderson, Kenny Bell, Maliek Collins, Corey Cooper, Jake Cotton, Alex Lewis, Josh Mitchell; Northwestern: Chi Chi Ariguzo, Ibraheim Campbell, Cameron Johnston, Brandon Vitabile, Dan Vitale; Ohio State: Darryl Baldwin, Vonn Bell, Ezekiel Elliott, Cameron Johnston, Devin Smith, Michael Thomas, Adolphus Washington; Penn State: Adrian Amos, Deion Barnes, Jesse James, Austin Johnson, Jordan Lucas, Angelo Mangiro, Trevor Williams; Purdue: Landon Feichter, Robert Kugler, Frankie Williams; Rutgers: Darius Hamilton, Kaleb Johnson, Kemoko Turay; Wisconsin: Sam Arneson, Rafael Gaglianone, Darius Hillary, Dallas Lewallen, Tyler Marz, Joe Schobert, Marcus Trotter

All-Americans
There are many outlets that award All-America honors in football.  The NCAA uses five official selectors to also determine Consensus and Unanimous All-America honors.  The five teams used by the NCAA to compile the consensus team are from the Associated Press, the AFCA, the FWAA, The Sporting News and the Walter Camp Football Foundation.  A point system is used to calculate the consensus honors.  The point system consists of three points for first team, two points for second team and three points for third team. No honorable mention or fourth team or lower are used in the computation.

The teams are compiled by position and the player accumulating the most points at each position is named a Consensus All-American. If there is a tie at a position in football for first team then the players who are tied shall be named to the team.  A player named first-team by all five of the NCAA-recognized selectors is recognized as a Unanimous All-American.

2014 First Team All-Americans

Joey Bosa, Tevin Coleman, Melvin Gordon and Brandon Scherff were declared Unanimous All-Americans for 2014 having been named to the First Teams by all five selectors recognized by the NCAA (Associated Press, American Football Coaches Association, Football Writers Association of America, Walter Camp, Sporting News)

Academic All-Americans

Six Big Ten student-athletes were named to the Capital One Academic All-America first or second teams in football as announced by CoSIDA.  The Big Ten has now led all Football Bowl Subdivision (FBS) conferences in Academic All-Americans for 10 straight seasons, with 78 honorees over that time span.

First Team: Mark Murphy, Indiana; Mike Sadler, Michigan State; Maxx Williams, Minnesota; Davie Milewski, Rutgers.  Second Team: Mark Weisman, Iowa; Jacoby Boren, Ohio State.

To be eligible for the award, a player must be in at least his second year of athletic eligibility, be a first-team or key performer and carry a cumulative 3.30 grade point average (GPA).

National Award Winners

 Tom Herman, Ohio State – Frank Broyles Award (top assistant coach)
 Melvin Gordon, Wisconsin – Doak Walker Award (top running back)
 Brad Craddock, Maryland – Lou Groza Award (top placekicker)
 Brandon Scherff, Iowa – Outland Trophy (top interior lineman)

Attendance

2015 NFL Draft

35 Big Ten athletes were selected in the 2015 NFL Draft.

In the explanations below, (PD) indicates trades completed prior to the start of the draft (i.e. Pre-Draft), while (D) denotes trades that took place during the 2015 draft.

Round one

Round two

Round four

Round five

NFL Draft Selections by NCAA Conference
SEC – 54
ACC – 47
Pac-12 – 39
Big Ten – 35
Big 12 – 25
American – 11
Mountain West – 10
C-USA – 6
Sun Belt – 3
Independents – 2
MAC – 0
Non-FBS Conferences – 24

Head coaches

 Tim Beckman, Illinois
 Kevin Wilson, Indiana
 Kirk Ferentz, Iowa
 Randy Edsall, Maryland
 Brady Hoke, Michigan
 Mark Dantonio, Michigan State
 Jerry Kill, Minnesota

 Bo Pelini, Nebraska
 Pat Fitzgerald, Northwestern
 Urban Meyer, Ohio State
 James Franklin, Penn State
 Darrell Hazell, Purdue
 Kyle Flood, Rutgers
 Gary Andersen, Wisconsin

References